Thomas Guthrie (1803–1873) was a Scottish divine and philanthropist

Thomas Guthrie may also refer to:

 Thomas Guthrie (director), British director, actor and musician
 Thomas Anstey Guthrie (1856–1934), English novelist and journalist, who wrote comic novels under the pseudonym F. Anstey
 Thomas Maule Guthrie (1870–1943), Scottish Liberal Member of Parliament for Moray and Nairn 1922–1923

See also 
 Thomas Guthrie Marquis (1864–1936), Canadian author